The Patroller is a French medium-altitude long-endurance unmanned aerial vehicle developed and manufactured by Safran Electronics & Defense (formerly by SAGEM). The airframe is based on the Stemme ASP S15 motor glider.

The first flight was in June 2009 at Kemijarvi in Finland; it was shown at the 2009 Paris Air Show. The Patroller is a Medium-altitude long-endurance unmanned aerial vehicle (MALE) by the definition of the NATO.

It completed another series of flight tests in July 2010, which demonstrated it is capable of missions lasting 20–30 hours; it can carry a 250 kg payload (including 80 kg under each wing).
 The Patroller will carry out imaging and surveillance trials in southern France, detecting forest fires.

The Patroller uses the same ground control station as Sperwer II. A Ku-band datalink is used; range is limited to 200 km (line of sight).

Safran Electronics & Defense and Egyptian aircraft factory AOI have signed a collaboration agreement concerning the Patroller UAV. AOI-Aircraft Factory could handle final assembly of the drones and will develop a dedicated training center in Egypt to train staff for the operation and maintenance of the drone systems.

Operators

French Army. 14 on order.

References

See also

Unmanned military aircraft of France
Mid-engined aircraft
Medium-altitude long-endurance unmanned aerial vehicles